Rocket Science are an Australian alternative rock band which formed in June 1998. They have released five studio albums, Welcome Aboard the 3C10 (2000), Contact High (2002), Eternal Holiday (2004), Different Like You (2008) and Snake (2019). Both Contact High and  Eternal Holiday peaked in the top 100 of the ARIA Albums Chart.

History

1998–2003: Welcome Aboard the 3C10 and Contact High
Rocket Science were formed in Melbourne in June 1998 by Dave Gray (of The Hogs) on semi-acoustic bass guitar, Paul Maybury (Freeloaders) on guitar, Roman Tucker (The Martians) on lead vocals and keyboards, and Kit Warhurst (Velvet Tongue) on drums. The group released their debut single "Burn in Hell" in 1999.

Their debut album, Welcome Aboard the 3C10, was issued on 1 May 2000 via Modular Recordings. Several tracks from their first rehearsal were used for the album.

Rocket Science's second album, Contact High, was released on 11 February 2002, which reached No. 60 on the ARIA Albums Chart. Michael Dwyer from The Age described it as "a refinement of a unique sonic formula that read something like this: schlock-horror/weird sci-fi films plus obscure garage-punk music plus massive vintage keyboard contraption complete with theremin equals Rocket Science." Carmine Pascuzzi of MediaSearch opined that "[it] shows good improvement – showcasing powerful rock and electronic grooves. They give a genuine tilt at the rock 'n' roll styling" where the group "demonstrates a purpose and ambition in delivering some infectious tracks. They are an interesting band with interesting ideas."

2004–2007: Eternal Holiday 
By April 2004, the band's their third album had been recorded and Tucker suffered a serious injury from a fall and was put into an induced coma for ten days. This forced the band to cancel performances until June. For an appearance at the Fuji Rock Festival in 2004, Maybury was replaced on guitar by Andre Warhurst (brother of Kit) when Maybury was unable to travel due to a broken leg. Andre Warhurst features in the video for the single Eternal Holiday, which was filmed in Japan during the visit. The album, Eternal Holiday was released on 15 September 2004, and produced by Jim Diamond. The album reached No. 67 on the ARIA Albums Chart. 

The Australian Record Industry Association reported that after his accident Tucker had "remembered precious little of the experience, but, when the other members played him the finished product, he thought that whoever it was, it was pretty good." Dwyer reviewed the album, which showed "a noticeable shift in the creative base. Warhurst's increased input as a writer and harmony singer has resulted in a more melodic and accessible finish to an ever-tighter band chemistry." The title track was released as the album's lead single, which a FasterLouder reviewer described as, "Despite the morbid undertones that inspired the song, it carries a surprisingly upbeat feeling overall with only a slight sense of gloom seeping in through the lyrics."

The group were dropped by their label but they recorded a fourth album, Different Like You which was released on 26 July 2008. It was engineered and produced by Maybury at his own recording studio. Luke McGrath from BMA Magazine felt it was "not so much a progression as a refinement – Different Like You is as loud, as brash and as concentrated a dose of Rocket Science as any fan could want." Shane Arnold from Music Feeds described its "raw high energy songs infused with theremin and rock & roll" and the group as "easily one of the best (and craziest) live acts going around currently and any albums like this are only going to enhance their reputation."

The album was preceded by the single "Psychic Man" Trevor Block of Mess+Noise website found it as "three-and-a-half minutes of growling Seeds/Stones hybrid, bursting with energy and plenty of the Science's trademark Farfisa organ honking all over a simple borrowed riff." By August 2008 Mickey Heartbreak (The Dead South) had joined on guitar. The group disbanded in late 2008.

2014–present: Reformation and Snake
In 2014, the group reformed.

In October 2014 Rocket Science reconvened for a benefit concert for Mick Blood of Lime Spiders at The Tote Hotel, Collingwood. They performed at the Leaps and Bounds Festival in July 2015.

In April 2018, Rocket Science released their first single, "Lipstick Red", of their anticipated fifth studio album.

Line up
Current members
Dave Gray – bass guitar
Paul Maybury – guitar, backing vocals
Roman Tucker – vocals, keyboards, theremin
Kit Warhurst – drums, vocals

Past members
Mickey Heartbreak – guitar (live only, 2008)

Discography

Albums

Live albums

Singles

References

Australian alternative rock groups
Victoria (Australia) musical groups
Musical groups established in 1998
Musical groups disestablished in 2008